The name Horacio is found sporadically throughout all of Latin America.

Historical Figures 
Horacio Quiroga, an Uruguayan author and writer.
Horacio Carochi, an Italian Jesuit priest and grammarian
Horacio Pagani (auto executive) (born 1955), Argentinian founder of Pagani Automobili S.p.A.
Horacio Pagani (sportswriter) (born 1948), Argentine sportswriter and sportscaster

Meaning
The name Horacio is a boy's name with Latin origins that means timekeeper.

Origin 
The masculine name Horacio \ho-ra-cio\ is a variant of Horace.

See also
See also the similarly spelled name Horatio.

References

Spanish masculine given names